Iosif Cavai (born 1 January 1951 in Timișoara) is a Romanian association football goalkeeper and coach.

Career as a player 
Dinamo București
Iosif Cavai played for Dinamo București from 1969 to 1976 and won three championship titles there: in 1970–71, 1972–73 and 1974–75.

Jiul Petroşani
Iosif Cavai was the goalkeeper of Jiul Petroşani for 9 seasons (1976–1985).
In 1981, he was named the best goalkeeper in the national championship when he was playing for this team.

Universitatea Cluj
From 1985 to 1990, Cavai played for Universitatea Cluj. Then, from 1990 to 2004 he held various positions in the club – stadium manager, assistant coach, goalkeeper coach and other.

Career as a coach 
Iosef Cavai was a coach in several teams, such as FC Timișoara and Universitatea Cluj.

Honours
Dinamo București
 Liga I: 1970–71, 1972–73, 1974–75

References

External links 
 FC Dinamo Bucureşti
 
 CityNews.ro

1951 births
Living people
Romanian footballers
Romania under-21 international footballers
Association football goalkeepers
Liga I players
Liga II players
CSM Jiul Petroșani players
FC Dinamo București players
FC Universitatea Cluj players
Romanian football managers
CSM Jiul Petroșani managers